"Chinese Taipei," the country designation under which Taiwan competes at international sports events, has participated in all editions of the Summer Universiade held since the 1989 Summer Universiade (the event's fourteenth year).

Medal count

Summer Universiade 
Chinese Taipei has won 276 medals in 16 appearances at the Summer Universiade and are in sixteenth place on the all-time Summer Universiade medal table.

Winter Universiade 
Chinese Taipei has won 1 medal at the Winter Universiade and is in forty-seventh place on the all-time Winter Universiade medal table.

See also 
 Chinese Taipei at the Olympics
 Chinese Taipei at the Paralympics

References

External links 

 
Nations at the Universiade
Sport in Taipei